Don "Mad Hatter" Ebert is a retired U.S. soccer forward who spent most of his career with two indoor clubs, the St. Louis Steamers and the Los Angeles Lazers.

Youth
Ebert attended Rosary High School in St. Louis, Missouri. In 1976, Ebert and his teammates went to the state high school championship game where they lost to Oakville High School, which was coached by Jim Bokern. Following high school, Ebert attended Southern Illinois University Edwardsville (SIU-E) where he played on the men’s soccer team from 1977 to 1979.  Ebert quickly became a mainstay of the Cougers offense, leading the team in goals all three seasons.  In 1977, he scored fourteen goals and was tied for the team lead in assists with six.  In 1978, he scored sixteen and in 1979 he upped his total once more, to twenty-two.  That season he also led the team in assists, with ten.  SIU-E also won the NCAA championship, defeating Clemson 3-2.  Ebert chose to leave college after only three years in order to pursue a professional career.  In 2006, SIU-E inducted the entire 1979 men’s soccer team into the school’s Athletic Hall of Fame.

Professional
The New York Cosmos of the North American Soccer League selected Ebert with the first pick in the 1980 College Draft.  Ebert, unhappy with his lack of playing time, and stubborn coach, asked for his release in June in order to go back to his home town and play for the St. Louis Steamers of Major Indoor Soccer League (MISL), whom he signed with in August 1980. That season, he led the team with 46 goals and 64 points. This extraordinary output by a rookie led to his selection as the 1980-1981 MISL Rookie of the Year.  He remained with the Steamers into the 1986-1987 season. That year, the Steamers began poorly and head coach Pat McBride was fired to be replaced by Tony Glavin. Glavin promptly traded Ebert to the Los Angeles Lazers where Ebert finished his career.

International career
Ebert was selected for the 1979 Pan American Games held in San Juan, Puerto Rico. Ebert made an immediate splash in the Pan American Games when he scored four goals in a 6-0 victory over the Dominican Republic. He was the captain of the U.S. team which qualified for the 1980 Summer Olympics. During qualification for the Olympic games the United States easily qualified as Ebert scored three goals in four games. Unfortunately for the Americans, President Jimmy Carter chose to boycott the games after the Soviet Union invaded Afghanistan.

Coaching
After retiring from soccer, Ebert became a youth soccer coach.  He is currently the Technical Director and Director of USSDA club Strikers FC in Irvine, California, as well as the head coach of NISA club California United Strikers FC. From 2001 to 2008, Ebert was head coach of the Concordia University Irvine soccer program. He left in 2008 with a lifetime record of 111 wins, 50 losses, and 7 ties (.660 win pct).

Other ventures
Ebert has been the Director of Marketing and Operations for Forum Boxing, Inc. He was the president and general manager of the defunct indoor club Anaheim Splash of the Continental Indoor Soccer League during the 1996 season.

References

External links
 Ebert's Irvine Strikers profile
 Ebert's NASL profile
 California United Strikers profile

Living people
Soccer players from St. Louis
American soccer players
Footballers at the 1979 Pan American Games
Pan American Games competitors for the United States
North American Soccer League (1968–1984) players
New York Cosmos players
Major Indoor Soccer League (1978–1992) players
St. Louis Steamers (original MISL) players
Los Angeles Lazers players
American soccer coaches
SIU Edwardsville Cougars men's soccer players
1959 births
Association football forwards
Major Indoor Soccer League (1978–1992) commentators
Concordia Eagles men's soccer coaches
National Independent Soccer Association coaches